The March Stakes (Japanese マーチステークス) is a Grade 3 horse race for Thoroughbreds aged four and over, run in March over a distance of 1800 metres on dirt at Nakayama Racecourse.

It was first run in 1994 and has held Grade 3 status ever since. The race was run at Hanshin Racecourse in 2011.

Winners since 2000

Earlier winners

 1994 - Bamboo Genesis
 1995 - Toyo Lyphard
 1996 - Ami Cyclone
 1997 - Wild Bluster
 1998 - Wild Bluster
 1999 - Tayasu K Point

See also
 Horse racing in Japan
 List of Japanese flat horse races

References

Dirt races in Japan